The Naked Jungle is a 1954 American adventure film directed by Byron Haskin, and starring Charlton Heston and Eleanor Parker. Telling the story of an attack of army ants on a Brazilian cocoa plantation, it was based on the 1937 short story "Leiningen Versus the Ants" by Carl Stephenson.

Plot
In 1901, Joanna arrives from New Orleans at a South American cocoa plantation to meet her new husband (whom she married by proxy), plantation owner Christopher Leiningen. This has been arranged by his brother in New Orleans. Leiningen is upset that she is a widow, as he wished to marry a virgin. She tells him a piano plays better if it has already been played.

Leiningen is cold and remote to her, rebuffing all her attempts to make friends with him. She is beautiful, independent, and arrives ready to be his stalwart helpmate. There is a strong sexual tension, which appears hard to resolve. Although there is mutual softening, he still decides to send her back to the US. Leiningen decides to advance this plan by a month when he hears from the local commissioner of a potential attack by an army of ants (marabunta), as he does not wish her to be harmed.

As she awaits the boat to take her back to the United States, they learn that legions of army ants - the "marabunta" - will strike in a few days' time. Leiningen refuses to give up the home he fought so hard to create. Instead of evacuating, he resolves to make a stand against this indomitable natural predator. The ants take several days to arrive and during that time their joint effort brings them closer and love begins to blossom. Joanna joins the fight to save the plantation.

Leiningen's most drastic action is blowing up a timber dam to flood his own estate, washing the ants away.

Cast

Production
In November 1952, George Pal announced he would adapt the short story "Leiningen Versus the Ants" into a feature film, with Philip Yordan to write the screenplay.

In March 1953, Charlton Heston was announced as the male lead. In May 1953, Teddi Sherman was reportedly working on the script. The screenplay was co-written by Ranald MacDougall and the blacklisted writer Ben Maddow.

William Conrad, who had starred as Leiningen in adaptations of Stephenson's story for the radio programs Escape and Suspense, appears in the film as the district commissioner (this was announced in July 1953).

The unique "sound" of the ants devouring everything in their path was created by swirling a straw in a glass of water with crushed ice, which was then amplified. Much of the Rio Negro (Amazon) jungle riverscape, as well as the bridge dynamiting and sluice scenes, are second-unit stock footage shot in Florahome, Florida.

Impact
The film was adapted for radio on the June 7, 1954 broadcast of the Lux Radio Theatre; Charlton Heston reprised his role as "Leiningen" and Donna Reed played "Joanna".

A scene from the film was used in the 1971 film The Hellstrom Chronicle.

The film strongly influenced the 1985 MacGyver episode "Trumbo's World", which also featured clips from the film.

In 1978, Martin Scorsese listed the film as among his "100 Random Pleasures" in a section of films which "are not good. They're guilty. But there are things in them that make you like them, that make them worthwhile."

Trivia
In 1970, it aired on WVUE-TV in New Orleans, Louisiana, as part of its highly publicized switch of channel positions with that city's PBS member station, WYES-TV.

References

External links 
 
 
 

Streaming audio
Leiningen Versus the Ants on Escape: January 14, 1948 
The Naked Jungle on Lux Radio Theater: June 7, 1954

1954 films
1950s adventure drama films
1954 romantic drama films
American adventure drama films
American romantic drama films
Adventure horror films
American romantic horror films
American horror drama films
American natural horror films
Arranged marriage in fiction
Fictional ants
Films about ants
Films based on short fiction
Films directed by Byron Haskin
Films produced by George Pal
Films scored by Daniele Amfitheatrof
Films set in 1901
Films set in Brazil
Films shot in Florida
Films with screenplays by Ranald MacDougall
Paramount Pictures films
1950s English-language films
1950s American films